Aplagiognathus is a genus of beetles in the family Cerambycidae, containing the following species:

 Aplagiognathus hybostoma Bates, 1879
 Aplagiognathus spinosus (Newman, 1840)

References

Prioninae